The Battle of Argoed Llwyfain was fought between the forces of the Kingdom of Rheged under the command of Urien and Owain mab Urien and the forces of the Kingdom of Bernicia under Fflamddwyn (Firestealer or Flamebearer).
Most of what is known about the battle comes from the early Welsh poem Gwaith Argoed Llwyfain by the poet and bard Taliesin. Supposedly on one Saturday, Fflamddwyn had surrounded the seat of power within Rheged and demanded that King Urien submit and provide hostages. Urien's son Owain used the memory of his ancestor Ceneu son of Coel and denied giving hostages. Urien then stirred his men and fighting began. In the ensuing combat Fflamddwyn was slain, temporarily freeing Rheged of the Anglian menace.

See also 
Battle of Alclud Ford
Taliesin
Rheged
Bernicia
Owain mab Urien
Urien
Theodric of Bernicia
Ida of Bernicia

References

Argoed Llwyfain
6th century in England
Argoed Llwyfain
Argoed Llwyfain
Hen Ogledd